is a former Japanese footballer.

Club career statistics
Updated to 31 December 2018.

References

External links
Profile at FC Gifu

1983 births
Living people
Hosei University alumni
Association football people from Hiroshima Prefecture
Japanese footballers
J1 League players
J2 League players
Ventforet Kofu players
Ehime FC players
Kyoto Sanga FC players
FC Gifu players
Association football midfielders